Paddy O'Rourke (born 12 January 1965) is a New Zealand cricketer. He played in 29 first-class and 19 List A matches for Wellington from 1989 to 1993.

See also
 List of Wellington representative cricketers

References

External links
 

1965 births
Living people
New Zealand cricketers
Wellington cricketers
Cricketers from Masterton